Seeds of Hope may refer to:

 Seeds of Hope, group of women activists who carried out an anti-war action in 1996
 Seeds of Hope: HIV/AIDS in Ethiopia, 2004 documentary film series directed by Dorothy Fadiman
 Seeds of Hope (album), 2011 studio album by Japanese reggae punk band SiM

See also
 Seed of Hope, television drama series that aired in Hong Kong in 2003